Mirza Yahya Khan Moshir od-Dowleh Qazvini  (1832 – 20 January 1892), was an Iranian politician and minister during the Qajar era. He was the fourth husband to a sister of Naser al-Din Shah Qajar, Ezzat ed-Dowleh.

Early life
Moshir od-Dowleh was born in 1832 in Qazvin. He was the son of Mirza Nabi Khan Amir od-Dowleh, who served as Governor of Fares and Isfahan. Moshir od-Dowleh finished his higher education in Paris, France. He was married to the Shah's sister Ezzat od-Dowleh, in 1868. Moshir od-Dowleh was foreign minister from 5 February 1886 to 1 August 1887 and was Justice Minister from 1888 until 1891. Mirza Yahya Khan Moshir od-Dowleh died in Tehran and was buried in Mashhed in 1892.

References

1832 births
1892 deaths
Politics of Qajar Iran
People from Qazvin Province
Foreign ministers of Iran
Ministers of Justice of Iran
People of Qajar Iran
19th-century Iranian politicians
Qajar governors of Gilan